A child speech corpus is a speech corpus documenting first-language language acquisition. Such databases are used in the development of computer-assisted language learning systems and the characterization of children's speech at difference ages. Children's speech varies not only by language, but also by region within a language. It can also be different for specific groups like autistic children, especially when emotion is considered. Thus different databases are needed for different populations. Corpora are available for American and British English as well as for many other European languages.

Overview of Children's Speech Corpora

In the table below, the age range may be described in terms of school grades. "K" denotes "kindergarten" while "G" denotes "grade". For example, an age range of "K - G10" refers to speakers ranging from kindergarten age to grade 10.

This table is based on a paper from the Interspeech conference, 2016. This online article is intended to provide an interactive table for readers and a place where information about children speech corpora that can be updated continuously by the speech research community.

See also

Computer-assisted language learning
Language acquisition
Language development
Non-native speech database

References

Corpora
Speech